Charles EP, or simply named Skids, is the first disc and EP of punk rock band Skids, recorded in October 1977 and released on 24 February 1978 on the Scottish punk label No Bad.  The lead track was originally planned to be "Test-Tube Babies," but between the recording sessions and the EP's release, the band felt their sound had moved on and was more properly represented by "Charles" and "Reasons." All music and lyrics were by Stuart Adamson, though the distinctive bass line in "Charles" later won Simpson plaudits from musicians such as The Edge and Peter Hook.

The band comprised a then teenage Richard Jobson on vocals, Stuart Adamson on guitar, Bill Simpson on bass and Thomas Kellichan on drums. They were credited on the EP with only their first names, Simpson being listed as Alexander. This was the result of the band's original punk-rock pseudonyms, in which Kellichan became Tom Bomb and Simpson became Alex Plode. 

The song "Charles" was featured in re-recorded form on the Scared to Dance debut album in 1979, while the rest of the songs were added as bonus tracks on that album's remastered edition.

Track listing
All tracks by Stuart

A-side
"Charles"

B-side
"Reasons"
"Test Tube Babies"

Personnel
Richard – Voice
Stuart – Guitar
Alexander – Bass
Thomas – Drums

References

External links
The Skids discography
Charles EP release

1977 debut EPs
Skids (band) albums